This is a list of names of Belgian places in other languages.

Flanders 
Flemish Region:

Wallonia 
Walloon Region:

Brussels 
Brussels-Capital Region:

See also
Names of Belarusian places in other languages
Names of Lithuanian places in other languages

Exonyms
 
Places in other languages
Alternative names of European places